Carlos Pérez Alonso (born 1 June 1935) is a Spanish long-distance runner. He competed in the marathon at the 1968 Summer Olympics and the 1972 Summer Olympics.

References

1935 births
Living people
Athletes (track and field) at the 1960 Summer Olympics
Athletes (track and field) at the 1968 Summer Olympics
Athletes (track and field) at the 1972 Summer Olympics
Spanish male long-distance runners
Spanish male marathon runners
Olympic athletes of Spain
Sportspeople from Vigo
Mediterranean Games bronze medalists for Spain
Mediterranean Games medalists in athletics
Athletes (track and field) at the 1959 Mediterranean Games
Athletes (track and field) at the 1967 Mediterranean Games